Rudolf Beerbohm (3 November 1941 – 1 June 2018) was a German equestrian. He competed in two events at the 1972 Summer Olympics.

References

External links
 

1941 births
2018 deaths
German male equestrians
Olympic equestrians of East Germany
Equestrians at the 1972 Summer Olympics
Sportspeople from Mecklenburg-Western Pomerania
People from Vorpommern-Rügen